School council may refer to:

 School Council, a teacher-student joint council system and house system of public schools in Myanmar (Burma)
 Schools Council, school exam coordinator in England and Wales
 Student council, organization of school students
 Students' union, organization of students, usually college or university